Gunnar Peder Kjønnøy (born 1947) is a Norwegian economist and civil servant.  He served as the County Governor of Finnmark county from 1998 until his retirement in 2016.

Personal life
Kjønnøy was born on 1 June 1947 in Averøy Municipality in Møre og Romsdal county, Norway.

Education and career
Kjønnøy graduated from the University of Oslo in 1972 with a cand.oecon. degree.  He was employed by the Ministry of Local Government and Regional Development, the Regional Development Fund, and the Ministry of Finance.

In 1980, was hired by the Norwegian Ministry of Fisheries.  During his time there he led the annual negotiations with the Soviet Union (and later Russia) on the resource management in the Barents Sea.  In December 1998, he was appointed as the County Governor of Finnmark county.  He held that position until 1 October 2016 when he retired.

References

1947 births
Living people
University of Oslo alumni
Norwegian civil servants
County governors of Norway
People from Averøy